is an original anime television series produced by Studio Deen that aired from July 8 to September 23, 2019.

Synopsis
Kochoki: Wakaki Nobunaga is an animated adaptation of Nobunaga Oda's teenage years up to his time as a warlord against his brother, Nobuyuki.

Cast

Production
The series was first announced on March 8, 2019. It made its debut on July 8, 2019 on Tokyo MX. Funimation licensed the series and aired their simuldub on July 22, 2019.

References

External links
 

2019 anime television series debuts
Action anime and manga
Historical anime and manga
Funimation